Danilo Portugal Bueno Ferreira (born 10 May 1983) is a Brazilian professional football manager and former player.

Honours
Goiás
Goiás State League: 2003, 2006

Campinense
Copa do Nordeste: 2013

External links

CBF data  
Goiás official profile 
Guardian Stats Centre

1983 births
Living people
Brazilian footballers
Brazilian football managers
Association football midfielders
Brazilian expatriate footballers
Expatriate footballers in Portugal
Campeonato Brasileiro Série A players
Primeira Liga players
Campeonato Brasileiro Série B players
Campeonato Brasileiro Série C players
Campeonato Brasileiro Série D managers
Goiás Esporte Clube players
Murici Futebol Clube players
Vitória F.C. players
Associação Atlética Ponte Preta players
Fortaleza Esporte Clube players
Brasiliense Futebol Clube players
Clube Recreativo e Atlético Catalano players
Botafogo Futebol Clube (SP) players
Esporte Clube Pelotas players
Goiânia Esporte Clube players
Campinense Clube players
Mineiros Esporte Clube players
Associação Atlética Aparecidense players
Joinville Esporte Clube managers
Sportspeople from Goiânia